The 2015–16 synchronized skating season began on July 1, 2015, and ended on June 30, 2016. During this season, which was concurrent with the season for the other four disciplines (men's single, ladies' single, pair skating and ice dancing), elite synchronized skating teams competed on the International Skating Union (ISU) Championship level at the 2016 World Championships. They also competed at various other international as well as national competitions.

Competitions
The 2015–16 season included the following major competitions.

Key

International medalists

References

https://web.archive.org/web/20141006142847/http://www.finlandiatrophy.com/en/Index.html

External links
 International Skating Union

2015 in figure skating
2016 in figure skating
Seasons in synchronized skating